The Strands of the Future is the second album by French progressive rock band Pulsar. The first half of the album consists of the title track, with extensive use of the mellotron, with the second half being a collection of shorter songs. The lyrics to the songs are written in both French and English, with the title track lyrics being in French.

Track listing

Personnel
 Victor Bosch - drums, percussion 
 Gilbert Gandil - guitars, vocals 
 Roland Richard - flute, strings 
 Jacques Roman - organ, mellotron, bass, synthesizers

References

Pulsar (band) albums
1976 albums